This is a list of burial places of the governors of California.

Burial places of the governors of California

See also
 List of governors of California
 List of burial places of presidents and vice presidents of the United States

Explanatory notes

References

Governors of California
California
Burial location